The play-offs of the 2020–21 Billie Jean King Cup Europe/Africa Zone Group I were the final stages of the Group I zonal competition involving teams from the Europe/Africa. Using the positions determined in their pools, the thirteen teams faced off to determine their placing in the 2020 Billie Jean King Cup Europe/Africa Zone Group I. The top four teams advanced to the 2020 Billie Jean King Cup Play-offs, while the bottom two teams were relegated to Europe/Africa Zone Group II for 2022.

Pool results

Promotional play-offs 
The first-placed and second-placed teams of each pool played against one another in a head-to-head round. The winners of each round advanced to the 2020 Billie Jean King Cup Play-offs.

Ukraine vs. Estonia

Croatia vs. Italy

Serbia vs. Slovenia

Poland vs. Sweden

Relegation play-offs 
The last-placed teams of each pool played against one another in a head-to-head round. The losers of each tie were relegated to Europe/Africa Zone Group II in 2022.

Bulgaria vs. Greece

Luxembourg vs. Turkey

Final placements 

References

External links 
 Fed Cup website

2020–21 Billie Jean King Cup Europe/Africa Zone